Kaldarreh may refer to:
 Kaldarreh-ye Olya
 Kaldarreh-ye Sofla